Salahlı may refer to:
Salahlı Kəngərli, Azerbaijan
Salahlı, Agstafa, Azerbaijan
Salahlı, Samukh, Azerbaijan
Salahlı, Yevlakh, Azerbaijan
Salahlı, Zardab, Azerbaijan
Aşağı Salahlı, Azerbaijan
Daş Salahlı, Azerbaijan
Orta Salahlı (disambiguation)
Yuxarı Salahlı, Azerbaijan